Sir John Rutherford, 1st Baronet (16 September 1854 – 26 February 1932) was a Conservative Party politician in the United Kingdom. He was educated at the Lancaster Royal Grammar School and the University of Glasgow.

Rutherford was Member of Parliament (MP) for Darwen in Lancashire from 1895 to January 1910 and from December 1910 to 1922.

Rutherford held a commission in the Duke of Lancaster's Own Yeomanry, where he was appointed a major on 27 August 1898, and received the honorary rank of lieutenant-colonel on 25 October 1902.

He was made a baronet on 27 January 1916.

A thoroughbred racehorse owner, his best horse was Solario, a winner of the St Leger Stakes and Ascot Gold Cup.

References

External links
Profile on Cricket Archive

1854 births
1932 deaths
Baronets in the Baronetage of the United Kingdom
Conservative Party (UK) MPs for English constituencies
UK MPs 1895–1900
UK MPs 1900–1906
UK MPs 1906–1910
UK MPs 1910–1918
UK MPs 1918–1922
British racehorse owners and breeders
English brewers
People educated at Lancaster Royal Grammar School